Sonya Koshkina (Ukrainian, Со́ня Ко́шкіна; alternate Romanizations, Sonja Koškina and Soni︠a︡ Koshkina;  born, July 8, 1985) is the pen name of Ksenia Mykytivna Vasilenko (Ксенія Микитівна Василенко), a Ukrainian journalist, who is also co-owner and editor-in-chief of the online publication,  (Livyi Bereh)

Early life and education
Ksenia Mykytivna Vasilenko was born in Kyiv, Ukrainian SSR, 1985. Her father is Mykita Kimovych Vasilenko, a lecturer at Taras Shevchenko National University of Kyiv (Kyiv National University; KNU). During the period of 1998–2002, she studied at the School of Young Journalists "Yun-Press" at the Kyiv Palace of Children and Youth. After graduating, she taught there for two years.

Career
She served as a correspondent of the newspaper The Day ("Den") (2003–05). In September 2005, she started working for the online publication Obozrevatel. It was then, at the suggestion of the site's editor-in-chief, Oleg Medvedev, that she took a pseudonym.

Koshkina graduated in 2007 from the Institute of Journalism, KNU. Dissatisfied with her education, she entered the graduate school of National University Odesa Law Academy, majoring in "Philosophy of Law". Since 2008, she has been teaching at the Gorshenin Institute in Kyiv.

In June 2009, leaving Obozrevatel, she became the editor-in-chief and co-owner of the Livyi Bereh online publication.

In October 2019, she defended her Ph.D. dissertation in KNU, where she taught journalism.

Koshkina is affiliated with the YouTube project, "Kishkina", and the author of, Maydan. An Untold Story.

Personal life
On May 23, 2019, Koshkina gave birth to a daughter named Esther.

Selected works
 Maydan. An Untold Story.

Awards
 2015, Winner of the All-Ukrainian Prize "Woman of the Third Millennium" in the nomination "Rating"
 2019, Masters category, Top 100 most influential women in Ukraine, Focus magazine

References

External links

 Sonya Koshkina at lb.ua

1985 births
Living people
Journalists from Kyiv
Ukrainian women journalists
Ukrainian women editors
Ukrainian editors
Ukrainian non-fiction writers
21st-century Ukrainian women writers
21st-century pseudonymous writers
Pseudonymous women writers
Taras Shevchenko National University of Kyiv alumni
Ukrainian women non-fiction writers